Frank Lisciandro is an American film maker, writer and photographer born in Brooklyn, New York. He studied Photojournalism at Michigan State University and Motion Picture production and writing at the University of California, Los Angeles (UCLA), graduating with an MFA; while at UCLA he studied photography with the renowned American photographer Robert Heinecken.

His works have appeared in books, magazines, documentary films, newspapers and record albums. His photographs have been shown in solo exhibitions and group shows in the USA, Italy and France. He has directed, produced and written more than 20 documentary films including "The Sugar Film", "The Target Zone", "Under the Influence" and "Siamo Fuori".

The Doors and Jim Morrison
While at UCLA, Lisciandro developed a close friendship with Jim Morrison and Ray Manzarek – singer and keyboardist with Doors respectively. He has been involved in several posthumous Morrison projects. In 1979, he co-produced Jim Morrison's album of poetry An American Prayer that was nominated for a Grammy Award and won the Dutch Edison Award. His work includes these books about Morrison and The Doors: An Hour for Magic, Feast of Friends, Jim Morrison: Diario Fotografico, Jim Morrison: Friends Gathered Together. He edited the documentaries Feast of Friends and Dawn's Highway; and edited and co-directed the film HWY: An American Pastoral.

His rock music photographs have appeared in Rolling Stone, the French magazine Rock & Folk, British music publications New Musical Express (NME), Uncut and Mojo as well as Italian publications La Republica and L'Unita.

Shows
Solo
(selective)
1982: Museum of Rock Art
1993-1994: FNAC (traveling exhibit in France)
2004: Photographic Image Gallery, Portland, Oregon
2004: Galerie Harwood, Montreal, Canada
2007: Galleria Arteutopia Milan, Italy
2008: Il Castello Marchionale, Este, Italy
2011: "Mississippi al Po" Festival, Piacenza, Italy
2012: Trasimeno Blues Festival, Umbria, Italy
2015: Italian Book Tour, Bari, Pesaro, Roma, Torino, Italy
2017: Parole spalancate, International Poetry Festival Genova, Italy
Collective
2011: Proud Gallery, London
2011: Russeck Gallery, New York
2011: Giustina Gallery, Cultural Art Show (Oregon State University)
2012: Linfield Art Gallery, Linfield College, McMinnville, Oregon

Audio
1979: An American Prayer (co-producer)

Filmography
(Direction/Production/Writing)
1969: Hwy: An American Pastoral  (co-director with Jim Morrison, and editor)
1970: Bongo Wolf's Revenge (cinematography)
1970: Feast of Friends (editor, documentary about The Doors)
1980: The Sugar Film1998: Siamo Fuori2000: Una Favola Vera2011: Dawn's Highway (co-editor, a documentary about Jim Morrison)

OthersThe Target ZoneOne of the FamilyUpfrontEl Carro NuevoUnder the InfluenceBooksAn Hour for Magic (Plexus Books, UK) (multilingual)A Feast of Friends (Warner Books) (multilingual, 1991)Jim Morrison: Diario Fotografico (Giunti, Italy, 2007)Jim Morrison: Friends Gathered Together'' (2014)

References

External links
Official website
Photos website

American photographers
Living people
Year of birth missing (living people)